The Nova Scotia is a historic nineteenth century pub on Spike Island adjacent to the Cumberland Basin in Bristol Harbour in Bristol, England. It was originally built as a terrace of three houses and then converted into a pub. It is a grade II listed building. It was a coaching inn and traces of large lanterns and the entrance to the coach yard survive.

The pub serves food and has a range of real ales and traditional cider.

References

Bristol Harbourside
Coaching inns
Commercial buildings completed in the 19th century
Grade II listed pubs in Bristol
Music venues in Bristol
Pubs in Gloucestershire